At least two ships of the Argentine Navy have been named ARA Salta :

 , a  launched in 1932 and decommissioned  in 1960.
 , a Type 209 submarine commissioned in 1973.

Argentine Navy ship names